Scotts Corner is a hamlet in Orange County, in the U.S. state of New York. It is located in the town of Montgomery

History
The community was named after John F. Scott, the proprietor of a store at the local crossroads. A variant name is "Scott's Corners".

References

Hamlets in Orange County, New York